This is a list of castles in Brazil.

Not having witnessed feudalism, Brazil does not have a lot of historic castles, but presents many castles built for tourism and entertainment, and also has factories and forts from colonial times. Some castles were built for religious purposes or to support the Arts, and the Sciences, others have quite an interesting history. 

 Castelo do Barão J. Smith de Vasconcellos
 Castelo de Pedras Altas
 Castelo do Batel - Curitiba
 Castelo do Pereira
 Ilha Fiscal
 Baruel Mansion
 Castelo de Pesqueira
 Castelo de Zé dos Montes
 Castelo do Instituto Ricardo Brennand
 Villa Medieval
 Castelo Garcia d'Ávila
 Castelo Mourisco
 Castelo do Lua Cheia Hostel
 Castelo Simões Lopes
 Castelo Furlani
 Castelo de Itaipava
 Castelo Eldorado
 Châuteau Lacave
 Castelo João Capão
 Castelo de Araras
 Castelo de Bívar
 Castelo Deputado Leonardo Moreira

See also
List of castles by country

 
Castles
Brazil
Castles
Brazil